This is a list of singles that have peaked in the Top 10 of the Billboard Hot 100 during 1972.

Al Green scored four top ten hits during the year with "Let's Stay Together", "Look What You Done for Me", "I'm Still in Love with You", and "You Ought to Be with Me", the most among all other artists.

Top-ten singles

1971 peaks

1973 peaks

See also
 1972 in music
 List of Hot 100 number-one singles of 1972 (U.S.)
 Billboard Year-End Hot 100 singles of 1972

References

General sources

Joel Whitburn Presents the Billboard Hot 100 Charts: The Seventies
Additional information obtained can be verified within Billboard's online archive services and print editions of the magazine.

1972
United States Hot 100 Top 10